Kyle Lander (born 21 January 1996) is a former Scottish professional footballer, who played as a striker for Newtongrange Star in the East of Scotland League. He has previously played for Livingston

Career

Livingston
Lander signed for Livingston at youth level in 2012 from Edina Hibs Boys Club. On 6 April 2013, he scored on his first-team debut at the age of 17 in a 3–0 win over Dumbarton. In total, he made 6 appearances in his debut season for Livingston in the first-team.

St Johnstone
Ahead of the 2014–15 season Lander moved to St Johnstone. On 1 September 2015, he moved on loan to Stiring Albion and had a further loan spell at Elgin City later the same season.

Juniors
On his release from St Johnstone, Lander joined Junior side Newtongrange Star in September 2016.

Lander played for Tranent Juniors between 2019 and 2022, but had to retire at 26 due to injury.

Career statistics

References

External links
 

1996 births
Living people
Association football forwards
Scottish Football League players
Scottish footballers
Livingston F.C. players
St Johnstone F.C. players
Stirling Albion F.C. players
Elgin City F.C. players
Newtongrange Star F.C. players
Tranent Juniors F.C. players
Scottish Professional Football League players
Scottish Junior Football Association players